Dark Roots of Earth is the eleventh studio album by American thrash metal band Testament. It was released on July 27, 2012, in Europe, and four days later in North America by independent German record label Nuclear Blast Records.  The album is available in three configurations, CD, CD/DVD and vinyl, with the latter two versions including four bonus tracks. The album was produced by Andy Sneap, who mixed and engineered the band's previous three studio releases, The Gathering (1999), First Strike Still Deadly (2001), and The Formation of Damnation (2008). The album artwork was created by Eliran Kantor. A music video was made for the track "Native Blood". Dark Roots of Earth entered the Billboard 200 at number 12, Testament's highest position ever.

This album saw a reunion with Gene Hoglan, who played drums on the band's 1997 album Demonic. During the recording, Hoglan filled in for Paul Bostaph who was unable to attend the recording sessions because of a "serious injury", although the latter left the band in December 2011. Chris Adler of Lamb of God provided drum tracks on the iTunes bonus version of "A Day in the Death". Dark Roots of Earth is also the last Testament album with bassist Greg Christian, who left the band for the second time in January 2014.

Songs
"Native Blood" was released as a single from the album on July 20, 2012, both as a download and a limited edition 7" single. A video was made for the song as well. A Spanish version of "Native Blood" entitled "Sangre Nativa" was released on the "Native Blood" single. Previously, "True American Hate" was released as a free download.

"Native Blood" was described as being about Billy's Native American heritage. "True American Hate" was written about the prevalence of hatred, particularly anti-Americanism, in younger generations around the world, often perpetuated by their upbringing. Billy has described "Cold Embrace" as being about "a girl becoming a vampire and never being able to see the sun again." He added that the band hoped to pitch it for a Twilight movie. "Dark Roots of Earth" was described as being a metaphor about the band. "Rise Up" is about war.

Critical reception

Dark Roots of Earth has received universal acclaim. Ryan Ogle of Blabbermouth.net awards the album eight-and-a-half stars out of ten and states, "This album is anything but a rehashing of former glories. The skilled interplay between Alex Skolnick and Eric Peterson, which features a wall-to-wall showcasing of intricate and harmonized runs, back-and-forth soloing, hooky riffs and metallic perfection, is at the centerpiece of this album. The duo displays everything that made them among the most formidable guitar teams on the late '80s / early '90s while placing everything into a modern context." Ogle also praises the music a "noticeably different vibe than its predecessor by leaning more towards their (now) classic American thrash roots", while he describes the album as a "2012 take on Testament's classic and pioneering sound."

Dark Roots of Earth sold over 20,000 copies in the United States in its first week of release, and reached number twelve on the Billboard 200—Testament's highest U.S. chart position to date. By March 2013, Dark Roots of Earth sold around 60,000 copies in the U.S.

Touring
To promote the album, Testament embarked on a U.S. and Canadian tour co-headlining with Anthrax and openers Death Angel in fall 2012. The three bands had already been touring the U.S. together since fall 2011, with Anthrax supporting their 2011 album Worship Music.

In January and February 2013, following the dates with Anthrax and Death Angel, Testament embarked on a U.S. headlining tour with Overkill, Flotsam and Jetsam, and Australian band 4Arm.

Track listing

Credits 
Writing, performance and production credits are adapted from the album liner notes.

Personnel 
Testament
 Chuck Billy – lead vocals
 Alex Skolnick – lead guitar
 Eric Peterson – rhythm guitar, backing vocals
 Greg Christian – bass
 Gene Hoglan – drums

Session musicians
 Chris Adler – drums on "A Day in the Death" (iTunes bonus track)

Production
 Andy Sneap – production, engineering, recording, mixing, mastering
 Juan Urteaga – additional recording
 Testament – production, mixing, mastering

Bonus cover tracks production
 Juan Urteaga – recording, mixing
 Nik Chinboukas – additional recording of "Dragon Attack"
 Paul Suarez – additional recording of "Animal Magnetism" and "Powerslave"
 Chuck Billy – mixing
 Eric Peterson – mixing

Artwork and design
 Eliran Kantor – cover art, booklet
 Eric Peterson – cover art concept
 Gino Carlini – photography

Studios 
 Driftwood Studios, Oakland, California, U.S. – recording
 Backstage Studios, Derby, England – recording
 Trident Studios, Martinez, California, U.S. – additional recording, recording (bonus cover tracks)
 Spin Studios, New York City, U.S. – additional recording (bonus cover tracks)

Chart positions

References

Testament (band) albums
2012 albums
Nuclear Blast albums
Albums with cover art by Eliran Kantor
Albums produced by Andy Sneap